Martin Frederick Ansel (December 12, 1850August 23, 1945) was the 89th governor of South Carolina from 1907 to 1911.

Born in Charleston, South Carolina, to John Ansel who was an immigrant from Württemberg in Germany and Fredrika Bowers, also a German immigrant, Martin grew up in the German "colony" of Walhalla, South Carolina. He was admitted to the bar in 1870, first practicing law in Franklin, North Carolina, for four years, then in Greenville, South Carolina, where he became involved in politics. He served in the state legislature between 1882 and 1888, then was elected solicitor in the eighth Judicial Circuit, where he stayed until 1901.

He explored a run for governor in 1902, but did not actually run until 1906.  He was re-elected in 1908. During his term, statewide prohibition was established.

He was first married to Ophelia Anne Speights, daughter of A.M. Speights, founder of The Greenville News,  with whom he had two daughters and a son, but who died in 1894, then to Addie Hollingsworth Harris, who died in 1937. One of his daughters, Frederica, christened the battleship USS South Carolina (BB-26) in 1908.
He served as an elder at First Presbyterian church of Greenville. He was interred in Springwood Cemetery in Greenville.

References

1850 births
1945 deaths
American people of German descent
Democratic Party governors of South Carolina
University of South Carolina trustees
South Carolina state solicitors
Politicians from Charleston, South Carolina
People from Walhalla, South Carolina